Gráinne Mary Walsh (born 13 October 1995) is an Irish boxer.

Early life

Walsh is a native of Tullamore. She was a talented soccer player with Shamrock Rovers Ladies F.C. and studied at NUI Galway.

Career

Walsh boxes at Spartacus Boxing Club in Tullamore.

Walsh won bronze at the 2019 European Games in Minsk.

References 

Living people
1995 births
Sportspeople from County Offaly
Irish women boxers
European Games bronze medalists for Ireland
European Games medalists in boxing
Boxers at the 2019 European Games
Welterweight boxers
21st-century Irish women